WRSC (1390 kHz) is a hot adult contemporary radio station broadcasting in State College, Pennsylvania, with a power of 2,000 watts daytime, and 1,000 watts nighttime.

History
WRSC moved its talk programming on 1390 AM to 103.1 FM on Monday, August 3, 2009, and is known as "Newsradio 103 WRSC." The AM station switched to a business news/talk format branded as "Money Talk 1390".

On November 18, 2013, WRSC changed their format to sports, branded as "1390 The Fanatic".

On May 20, 2015, WRSC flipped back to news/talk as "Newsradio 1390 WRSC".

It was announced on October 12, 2022, that Forever Media was selling 34 stations, including WRSC and five other sister stations, to State College-based Seven Mountains Media for $17.3 million. The deal closed on January 2, 2023.

On December 30, 2022, it was announced that the station would change its format to top 40, branded as "Pop Radio" within days. The talk format would move to WRSC-FM (95.3) on January 4, 2023.

References

External links

RSC
Hot adult contemporary radio stations in the United States
Radio stations established in 1961
1961 establishments in Pennsylvania